The Lanima were an indigenous people of the state of Queensland.

Language
Almost nothing is known of the Lanima language, apart from a suggestion that it was called Wanggamana.

Country

Alternative names
 Wanggamanha. (language name)
 Wonggaman

Notes

Citations

Sources

Aboriginal peoples of Queensland